The 1919–20 season was the 21st season for FC Barcelona.

Results 

 1. The Barcelona go directly to the final after failing to reach agreement with Sevilla to play the two semifinals matches in Madrid.
 2. The semifinal was scheduled for 18 and 19. Sevilla is not presented to the party, claiming that they are celebrating the "Feria de Abril" Trans Federation and the Barcelona won the tie and therefore finalist.
 3. Taking advantage of the team is to play for Madrid Cup semifinal, which took place in Seville no-show. Play this friendly match.

External links

webdelcule.com
webdelcule.com

References

FC Barcelona seasons
Barcelona